Slic3r is free software 3D slicing engine for 3D printers. It generates G-code from 3D CAD files (STL or OBJ).  Once finished, an appropriate G-code file for the production of the 3D modeled part or object is sent to the 3D printer for the manufacturing of a physical object. As of 2013, about half of the 3D printers tested by Make Magazine supported Slic3r.

Prusa Research maintains an advanced fork optimized for the Prusa i3 series called PrusaSlicer.

SuperSlicer is a further fork of PrusaSlicer

References

External links
 
 Slic3r Github repository
 List of Slic3r placeholders variables 

Free computer-aided manufacturing software
Software using the GNU AGPL license
Software that uses wxWidgets
3D printing